The Capricorn ctenotus (Ctenotus capricorni)  is a species of skink found in Queensland in  Australia.

References

capricorni
Reptiles described in 1981
Taxa named by Glen Milton Storr